Allan Cavan (March 25, 1880 – January 19, 1941) was an American film actor. He appeared in 145 films between 1917 and 1941.

Cavan was the son of Mrs. Averila Cavan, and he had a brother, Carl. He began working on films with Sam Goldwyn Studios in 1916 and later worked for Warner Bros.

Cavan died at Cedars of Lebanon Hospital on January 19, 1941, aged 60.

Partial filmography

 The Scarlet Car (1917) - a mob member (uncredited)
 Big Business (1924)
 Leave It to Gerry (1924)
 The Mysterious Mystery! (1924)
 Thundering Fleas (1926) - father of the bride
 London After Midnight (1927) - Estate agent
 The Million Dollar Collar (1929)
 The Donovan Affair (1929)
 Painted Faces (1929)
 Saturday's Lesson (1929)
 No Limit (1931)
 Dishonored (1931)
 New Adventures of Get Rich Quick Wallingford (1931)
 The Intruder (1933)
 Transatlantic Merry-Go-Round (1934)
 Badge of Honor (1934)
 Thicker than Water (1935)
 The Adventures of Rex and Rinty (1935)
 Red Salute (1935)
 Hong Kong Nights (1935)
 Streamline Express (1935)
 The New Frontier (1935)
 Hearts in Bondage (1936)
 Code of the Range (1936)
 Rebellion (1936)
 Jail Bait (1937)
 Two Gun Justice (1938)
 Paroled from the Big House (1938)
 Brother Rat (1938)
 In Old Montana (1939)

References

External links

1880 births
1941 deaths
American male film actors
20th-century American male actors
Male actors from California